Pogonocherus inermicollis is a species of beetle in the family Cerambycidae. It was described by Edmund Reitter in 1894. It is known from the Caucasus Mountains.

References

Pogonocherini
Beetles described in 1894